The 1982 Wichita State Shockers baseball team represented Wichita State University in the 1982 NCAA Division I baseball season. The Shockers played their home games at Shocker Field in Wichita, Kansas. The team was coached by Gene Stephenson in his fifth season as head coach at Wichita State.

The Shockers reached the College World Series, finishing as the runner up to Miami (FL).

Personnel

Roster

Coaches

Schedule

References 

Wichita State
Wichita State Shockers baseball seasons
College World Series seasons
Wichita State Baseball
Missouri Valley Conference baseball champion seasons